Aubrometz is a commune in the Pas-de-Calais department in northern France.

Geography
A small village located 25 miles (40 km) west of Arras on the D340 road, in the valley of the river Canche.

Population

Sights
 The church of St. Thomas Becket, dating from the fifteenth century

See also
Communes of the Pas-de-Calais department

References

Communes of Pas-de-Calais